Claudia Thomas may refer to
Claudia L. Thomas, African-American orthopedic surgeon
Claudia Kolb (married name Claudia Thomas, born 1949), American swimmer